Fructose 2,6-bisphosphate, abbreviated Fru-2,6-P2, is a metabolite that allosterically affects the activity of the enzymes phosphofructokinase 1 (PFK-1) and fructose 1,6-bisphosphatase (FBPase-1) to regulate glycolysis and gluconeogenesis.  Fru-2,6-P2 itself is synthesized and broken down by the bifunctional enzyme phosphofructokinase 2/fructose-2,6-bisphosphatase (PFK-2/FBPase-2).

The synthesis of Fru-2,6-P2 is performed through a bifunctional enzyme containing both PFK-2 and FBPase-2, which is dephosphorylated, allowing the PFK-2 portion to phosphorylate fructose 6-phosphate using ATP.  The breakdown of Fru-2,6-P2 is catalyzed by the phosphorylation of the bifunctional enzyme, which allows FBPase-2 to dephosphorylate fructose 2,6-bisphosphate to produce fructose 6-phosphate and Pi.

Effects on glucose metabolism
Fru-2,6-P2 strongly activates glucose breakdown in glycolysis through allosteric modulation (activation) of phosphofructokinase 1 (PFK-1).  Elevated expression of Fru-2,6-P2 levels in the liver allosterically activates phosphofructokinase 1 by increasing the enzyme’s affinity for fructose 6-phosphate, while decreasing its affinity for inhibitory ATP and citrate.  At physiological concentration, PFK-1 is almost completely inactive, but interaction with Fru-2,6-P2 activates the enzyme to stimulate glycolysis and enhance breakdown of glucose.

Cellular stress as a result of oncogenesis or DNA damage among others, activates certain genes by the tumor suppressor p53. One such gene is for the expression of TP53-induced glycolysis and apoptosis regulator (TIGAR); an enzyme that inhibits glycolysis, monitors the cellular levels of reactive oxygen species, and protects cells from apoptosis. The structure of TIGAR is shown to be nearly identical to FBPase-2 on the bifunctional enzyme. TIGAR removes the allosteric effector, Fru-2,6-P2., therefore the activator does not enhance the affinity of the enzyme (PFK1) for its substrate (fructose 6-phosphate). Furthermore, TIGAR also removes the glycolytic intermediate fructose 1,6-bisphosphate, the product of the PFK catalyzed third reaction of glycolysis and the substrate for the following aldolase fourth reaction of glycolysis.

Production regulation
The concentration of Fru-2,6-P2 in cells is controlled through regulation of the synthesis and breakdown by PFK-2/FBPase-2.  The primary regulators of this are the hormones insulin, glucagon, and epinephrine which affect the enzyme through phosphorylation/dephosphorylation reactions.  Release of the hormone glucagon triggers production of cyclic adenosine monophosphate (cAMP), which activates a cAMP-dependent protein kinase.  This kinase phosphorylates the PFK-2/FBPase-2 enzyme at an NH2-terminal Ser residue with ATP to activate the FBPase-2 activity and inhibit the PFK-2 activity of the enzyme, thus reducing levels of Fru-2,6-P2 in the cell. With decreasing amounts of Fru-2,6-P2, glycolysis becomes inhibited while gluconeogenesis is activated.  Insulin triggers the opposite response. As a phosphoprotein phosphatase, insulin dephosphorylates the enzyme, thus activating the PFK-2 and inhibiting the FBPase-2 activities.  With additional Fru-2,6-P2 present, activation of PFK-1 occurs to stimulate glycolysis while inhibiting gluconeogenesis.

Regulation of sucrose production
Fru-2,6-P2 plays an important role in the regulation of triose phosphates, the end products of the Calvin Cycle.  In the Calvin Cycle, 5/6th of triose phosphates are recycled to make ribulose 1,5-bisphosphate.  The remaining 1/6 of triose phosphate can be converted into sucrose or stored as starch.  Fru-2,6-P2 inhibits production of fructose 6-phosphate, a necessary element for sucrose synthesis.  When the rate of photosynthesis in the light reactions is high, triose phosphates are constantly produced and the production of Fru-2,6-P2 is inhibited, thus producing sucrose.  Fru-2,6-P2 production is activated when plants are in the dark and photosynthesis and triose phosphates are not produced.

See also
 Fructose 2,6-bisphosphatase
 Fructose 1,6-bisphosphate

References

Monosaccharide derivatives
Organophosphates